Yeerongpilly railway station is located on the Beenleigh line in Queensland, Australia. It serves the Brisbane suburb of Yeerongpilly. Immediately south-west of the station, the Corinda line branches off.

To the west of the station lies the NSW North Coast dual gauge line primarily used by Gold Coast, NSW TrainLink XPT and freight services.

History
Yeerongpilly station opened in 1884 as Logan Junction with the opening of the railway to Loganlea. It was renamed South Coast Junction in 1885 and again to Yeerongpilly in 1893.

It was the junction station for the Corinda line until passenger services ceased on the line in June 2011 and were replaced by Brisbane Transport's route 104.

The design for the Queensland Tennis Centre included extending the footbridge over Fairfield Road, however when the centre was built it was not included. Construction eventually commenced in July 2010, with the new bridge opened on 29 December 2010 in time for the 2011 Brisbane International.

With the opening of the NSW North Coast line to South Brisbane in 1930, the New South Wales Government Railways opened a depot to the south of the station. This closed on 13 February 1997 with the turntable relocated to the new National Rail Acacia Ridge facility.

In 1995, as part of the construction of the Gold Coast line, the standard gauge line from South Brisbane was converted to dual gauge. This was later extended to Salisbury.

Services
Yeerongpilly station is served by all stops Beenleigh line services from Beenleigh, Kuraby and Coopers Plains to Bowen Hills and Ferny Grove.

Services by platform

Transport links
Brisbane Transport operate three routes via Yeerongpilly station:
104: Corinda to Princess Alexandra Hospital
105: Indooroopilly to Brisbane City via Yeronga
108: Indooroopilly to Brisbane City

References

External links

Yeerongpilly station Queensland Rail
Yeerongpilly station Queensland's Railways on the Internet
[ Yeerongpilly station] TransLink travel information

Railway stations in Brisbane
Railway stations in Australia opened in 1884